The 1963 Queensland state election was held on 1 June 1963.

The Queensland Labor Party (QLP) formally affiliated with the national Democratic Labor Party (DLP) in 1962, resulting in two of its members resigning to sit as independents. Seats won by the QLP in 1960 are listed as DLP-held below.

By-elections
 On 1 July 1961, Eugene O'Donnell (Labor) was elected to succeed Edward Davis (Labor), who had died on 10 March 1961, as the member for Barcoo.
 On 1 July 1961, Ron Camm (Country) was elected to succeed Lloyd Roberts, who had died on 11 March 1961, as the member for Whitsunday

Retiring Members
Note: Mount Gravatt Liberal MLA Graham Hart resigned shortly before the election; no by-election was held.

Labor
Jim Burrows MLA (Port Curtis)

Liberal
Kenneth Morris MLA (Mount Coot-tha)
Harold Taylor MLA (Clayfield)

Candidates
Sitting members at the time of the election are shown in bold text.

See also
 1963 Queensland state election
 Members of the Queensland Legislative Assembly, 1960–1963
 Members of the Queensland Legislative Assembly, 1963–1966
 List of political parties in Australia

References
 

Candidates for Queensland state elections